The Penang Island Jazz Festival, founded in 2004, is an independent festival organized by The Capricorn Connection, which started out as a two-day event with 12 groups from 6 countries has expanded into four days and has featured over 100 groups from over 25 countries to date.
 
Besides the outdoor main "Jazz By The Beach" stage featuring local and international performers, the festival, which is held annually on the first weekend of December on the island of Penang Malaysia has a number of other supporting musical activities such as workshops, forum, exhibitions, drum circle, charity dinner and fringe stages. The festival attracts a regional audience and has established itself to be one of the more highly anticipated and important musical festivals in the South East Asian Region. 
  
Some of the festival's previous years' performers include Martin Taylor, Tommy Emmanuel, Steve Hackett, Shakatak, Rusconi, In The Country, Ulf Wakenius, Butterscotch, Madeline Bell, Celso Machado, Janek Gwizdala Project featuring Jojo Mayer, Estudiantina Ensemble, Nah Youn Sun and John Kaizan Neptune.

References

 
 
  
 
 
 
 
 

Jazz festivals in Malaysia